Trompe-l'œil is the second album by the indie rock band Malajube, released in 2006 on Dare to Care Records. The album is inspired in part by medical themes; in the album's liner notes, each song is given a subtitle relating to some aspect of physical or mental health.

Critical reception
Unusual for a French language album from Quebec, the album received significant critical attention in both English Canada and the United States, including airplay on CBC Radio 3 and a favourable review on Pitchfork Media.

The album was also shortlisted for the 2006 Polaris Music Prize. It was the first francophone album to be on that award's shortlist.

Music videos
They have released music videos for "Montréal -40°C", "Pâte Filo", "Le Crabe", "Ton Plat Favori", "Fille à plumes" and "Étienne D'Août".

Track listing
Thematic subtitles for each track in parentheses, per the liner notes

"Le Grand Galion" starts at 8:52 into "La Fin".

Étienne d'août single

Guest musicians
"Jus De Canneberges" - Ryan Battistuzzi on guitar, Catherine Lesaunier on cello and Martine Gaumond on violin
"Montréal -40°C" - Pierre Lapointe, Martin Pelland and Simon Proulx on vocals, Valérie Jodoin-Keaton on western concert flute and vocals, Ryan Battistuzzi on guitar and Joe des Breast on maracas
"Pâte Filo" - Ryan Battistuzzi on slide guitar, Catherine Lesaunier on cello and Martine Gaumond on violin
"Le Crabe" - Valérie Jodoin-Keaton on vocals
"La Monogamie" - Valérie Jodoin-Keaton and Virginie Parr on vocals and Ryan Battistuzzi on slide guitar
"Ton Plat Favori" - Valérie Jodoin-Keaton on vocals.
"La Russe" - Loco Locass on vocals.
"Casse-cou" - Valérie Jodoin-Keaton on western concert flute and vocals and Ryan Battistuzzi on guitar
"Étienne D'Août" - Catherine Lesaunier on cello and Martine Gaumond on violin

In popular culture
The song "Fille à plume" was used on EA Sports Rugby 08, and was used for a video compilation of the 2003 IRB Rugby World Cup.

References

2006 albums
Malajube albums
Bravo Musique albums